The 2011 Abu Dhabi GP2 Asia round was the first round of the 2011 GP2 Asia Series season. It was held on 11 and 12 February 2011 at Yas Marina Circuit in Abu Dhabi, United Arab Emirates.

This round saw the competitive début of the new Dallara GP2/11 chassis, which was brought in as a replacement for the first-generation GP2 car, the Dallara GP2/05, which débuted in the inaugural season of the series. It was also the first race for new tyre supplier Pirelli, after Bridgestone bowed out of Formula One and the main series at the end of 2010.

Classification

Qualifying

Notes
 – Aleshin was handed a three grid position penalty for crossing the finish line more than once at the end of the session.
 – Fauzy was handed a ten grid position penalty for causing a collision.

Race 1

Notes
 – Chilton was penalised 20 seconds for failing to respect the track limits.

Race 2

Notes
 – Bianchi, Pic and Berthon were penalised 20 seconds for not respecting yellow flags.

See also 
 2011 Yas V8 400

References

2011 in Emirati motorsport
GP2 Asia Series